Nairi or Nayiri (in Armenian Նայիրի) is an Armenian given name, it may also refer to:

Places
Nairi, Armenian Highlands. One of the historical names of Armenia 
The town of Hatsik, Armavir was called Nairi from 1963 till 1991
Nairi Cinema, large cinema hall in Yerevan, Armenia

People
Nairi Grigorian, Spanish pianist of Armenian origin
Nairi Hunanyan, leader of an armed attack on the Armenian Parliament on October 27, 1999
Nairi Zarian, Soviet Armenian poet and writer

Media
Nairi Publishing House, a publishing house in Yerevan, Armenia
Nayiri (periodical) a Beirut-based Armenian-language literary periodical
Nairi: Tower of Shirin, a 2018 adventure game and visual novel

Sports
Alashkert Stadium in Yerevan, Armenia, known as Nairi Stadium until 2013
Nairi SC, Yerevan-based Armenian football club

Others
Nairi (computer), a Soviet Armenian computer 
Nairi brandy by Yerevan Brandy Company

See also
Nairi (Armenian usages), an informal synonym for Armenia, which in turn gave rise to a number of modern usages
Ngaire (disambiguation), including the names Ngaire and Nyree, pronounced similarly to Nairi